Benjamin Shreve (1908–1985) was an American amateur herpetologist. He was from a wealthy Boston family of jewellers (partners and managers of Shreve, Crump & Low) and worked at the Harvard Museum of Comparative Zoology as a volunteer. He was trained by Arthur Loveridge to deal with materials from elsewhere than Africa. Shreve described many species from the West Indies together with Thomas Barbour. In these papers, Shreve is said to have done the "spadework" while Barbour wrote "florid" introductions.

Species named in honor of Benjamin Shreve
Reptiles named in honor of Shreve include:
Dipsadoboa shrevei – Shreve's (nocturnal) tree snake 
Oreosaurus shrevei – Shreve's lightbulb lizard (Riama shrevei is a synonym)
Anolis shrevei – Shreve's anole
Sphaerodactylus shrevei – Shreve's least gecko

Amphibians named in honor of Shreve are:
Dendrobates shrevei (now a synonym of Andinobates minutus) – bluebelly poison frog
Hyla shrevei (now a synonym of Osteopilus wilderi) – green bromeliad frog or Wilder's treefrog
Anomaloglossus shrevei – Shreve's rocket frog
Pristimantis shrevei

References

1908 births
1985 deaths
American herpetologists
20th-century American zoologists